IBM Yamato Facility located in the city of Yamato, Kanagawa Prefecture, Japan, is where IBM's research and development activities were done for IBM's worldwide and Asia-Pacific region market.  Its buildings were designed by the architecture firm of Nikken Sekkei Ltd. and completed in 1985. In July 2012, all IBM research and development functions completed moving to IBM Toyosu Facility, Tokyo. The last IBM-related organizations left Yamato around September 2012, and the facility is no longer associated with IBM.

IBM Yamato Facility houses IBM's research and development centers in Japan. Its address is 1623-14, Shimo-tsuruma, Yamato City, Kanagawa Prefecture, Japan. Its buildings were completed in 1985.

IBM Yamato Development Laboratory

History

A brief history is as follows:
In the 1960s IBM did small-scale development activities in Japan, using RPQ procedure at its Special Engineering department.
In 1972 IBM Japan Development Laboratory (JDL) was established in Tokyo.
JDL moved to IBM Fujisawa Plant site in 1975, becoming IBM Fujisawa Development Laboratory (FDL).
In 1985 FDL moved to the current site, becoming IBM Yamato Development Laboratory (usually called Yamato Lab, not YDL), and the IBM Tokyo Programming Center (VM/Office System, Banking System, Retail System, etc.) at Kawasaki also moved here. 
In 1993 IBM Tokyo Research Laboratory also moved to Yamato.
As IBM sold its Personal Computer Division to Lenovo in 2005, Yamato Lab's ThinkPad departments were separated, but remain at Yamato site.

Development Lab Directors

The Development Lab Directors (or those who were in charge of Development & Manufacturing) were:

 Edward V. Hoffler (1971–1974)
 Nobuo Mii (1974–1977)
 Keiichiro Meigo
 Hajime Watabe
 Toshio Yasui (1987–1991)
 Kiyoji Ishida
 Tsutomu Maruyama
 Yukako Uchinaga (2004–2007)
 Yoshinori Sakaue (2007–2008)
 Kazushi Kuse (2009- )

Development project areas
Project areas that were at the IBM Yamato Facility according to IBM Japan include:
server systems, storage systems, embedded hardware, communication systems, printers, retail store systems, application systems, telecommunication, Internet related, pervasive computing, finance industry systems, customer relationship management (CRM), business intelligence (BI), and technical and consulting services about hardware and software.

IBM Tokyo Research Laboratory

IBM Tokyo Research Laboratory, also known as TRL, was established in 1983, as IBM's first research center in Asia. It was initially located in Tokyo, but moved to the Yamato site in 1993. It is involved in the basic researches, in association with IBM's other research centers at Yorktown Heights, New York (Thomas J. Watson Research Center); Zurich, Switzerland; etc. In 2008, there are 200 researchers.

See also

 IBM
 IBM Japan, Ltd. (in Japanese)
 IBM Hakozaki Facility (Marketing)

References

External links
 IBM Japan's Facilities: R&D (in Japanese)
 IBM Tokyo Research Laboratory

IBM facilities
Buildings and structures completed in 1985
1985 establishments in Japan
2012 disestablishments in Japan
Yamato, Kanagawa